Ethan Phillips (born John Ethan Phillips February 8, 1955) is an American actor and playwright. He is best known for his television roles as Neelix on Star Trek: Voyager and PR man Pete Downey on Benson.

Personal life
Phillips was raised on Long Island, New York. His father was the owner of Frankie & Johnnie's, a steakhouse on 45th and Eighth Avenue in New York City. He received a bachelor's degree in English literature from Boston University and a Master of Fine Arts from Cornell University. He plays the tenor saxophone in the Alan Wasserman Jazz Band.

Career

Theatre
Ethan Phillips began his show business career in New York City, performing off-Broadway at theaters including Direct Theater, winning the Best of the Actors’ Festival there in 1977; at the Wonderhorse Theater, in the premiere of Christopher Durang's The Nature and Purpose of the Universe;  and at Playwrights Horizons in a revival of Eccentricities of a Nightingale. Tennessee Williams, who helped shape the latter production, wrote a new monologue for Phillips, which Williams personally dictated to him when it was realized that leading lady Jill Eikenberry needed more time for a dress change.

In 1979–80, Phillips appeared as Maurice Utrillo in the premier of Dennis McIntyre's Modigliani, with Jeffrey DeMunn, at the Astor Place Theater. It ran for 208 performances.

Phillips performed in many plays in New York over the next fifteen years, including Terrence McNally's Lips Together, Teeth Apart at the Lucille Lortel, Measure for Measure with Kevin Kline at The Public Theater's Delacorte Theater; and the Broadway premier of My Favorite Year at Lincoln Center, with Andrea Martin and Tim Curry, as well as new works for Ars Nova (theater), Ensemble Studio Theatre, Playwrights Horizons, the Hudson Guild Theater, the American Jewish Theater, and many others.

He went on to appear in the premier of David Mamet's November with Nathan Lane and Laurie Metcalf at the Ethel Barrymore Theater and performed it once more with John Malkovich and Patti Lupone for Stars in the House.  He played the title character opposite Peter Dinklage in The Imaginary Invalid for Bard College's 2012 SummerScape Festival. In 2013-14 he appeared as Stanley Levison in Robert Schenkkan's All the Way at the American Repertory Theater. Phillips moved with the show to Broadway's Neil Simon Theater where the play won the Tony Award for Best Play and Best Actor, Bryan Cranston. More recently Phillips played leading roles in the premiers of Dennis Kelly’s Taking Care of Baby, Terrence McNally's Golden Age, and Sharyn Rothstein's By the Water, all for the Manhattan Theatre Club (off-Broadway). Most recently, Ethan played Murray Lefkowitz in the Broadway premier of Ayad Akhtar's Junk: The Golden Age of Debt at Lincoln Center's Vivian Beaumont Theater.

Phillips' regional theater credits include leading roles for San Diego's Old Globe Theater, the Alaska Repertory Theater, at Seattle Repertory Theater, at Baltimore's Centerstage, for the Westport Country Playhouse, Boston Shakespeare Company, Actors Theater of Louisville, The American Repertory Theater, the Salt Lake Acting Co., and the McCarter Theatre. In Los Angeles, Phillips acted in Side Man at the Pasadena Playhouse, in Lips Together, Teeth Apart for the Mark Taper Forum; in You Can't Take It with You at the Geffen Playhouse, in The Bourgeois Gentleman for the Pasadena Symphony, and as Polonius in Hamlet for the Uprising Theater.

Phillips has been an actor at the Sundance Institute's Playwrights Conference in Utah for six summers, where he developed his play Penguin Blues, which is published by Samuel French Inc. and is included in The Best Short Plays of 1989 (Applause, ed. Ramon Delgado). Based on his experiences at Sundance, Phillips helped found First Stage, a playwright development lab in Los Angeles.

Films
Phillips has appeared in over fifty films, beginning with Ragtime (directed by Miloš Forman). Other features include For Richer or Poorer, Jeffrey, The Shadow, Wagons East, The Man Without a Face, Green Card, Lean On Me, Critters, Bloodhounds of Broadway, The Island, Bad Santa, and The Babysitters. More recent films include Shadow Witness, Audrey, the Coen Brothers' Inside Llewyn Davis, Woody Allen's Irrational Man, and James DeMonaco's The Purge: Election Year.

Television
In 1980, Phillips joined the cast of the sitcom Benson, playing PR man Pete Downey for five seasons.

He has made scores of guest appearances on television series and tele films, including Pushing Daisies, Bones (TV Series), Eli Stone, Criminal Minds, NUMB3RS, Las Vegas, L.A. Law, JAG, Law & Order, Arrested Development, Boston Legal, Castle, Rizzoli & Isles, The Good Guys and The Mentalist, Deadbeat, The Good Wife, New Amsterdam (2018 TV series), Better Call Saul and Veep. He played the recurring role of Keith in the final two seasons of Lena Dunham's Girls. He currently plays Spike Martin in Armando Iannucci's space comedy Avenue 5 on HBO.

In 1990, he began his Star Trek career playing the Ferengi character, Dr. Farek, in the "Ménage à Troi" episode of Star Trek: The Next Generation. He went on to play Neelix on Star Trek: Voyager in 1995, and stayed with the series through its entire seven-season run. He also cameoed as a holographic nightclub maître d' in the 1996 film Star Trek: First Contact, and appeared as a Ferengi pirate captain in the "Acquisition" episode of Star Trek: Enterprise.

Phillips has also performed voice work for several of the Star Wars franchise video games: 2000's Star Wars: Force Commander, 2001's Star Wars: Galactic Battlegrounds, and 2003's Star Wars: Knights of the Old Republic.

Filmography

Film

Television

Stage

Video games

References

Further reading
 The Star Trek Cookbook - Ethan Philips and William J. Birnes

External links

 

1955 births
Living people
People from Garden City, New York
Male actors from New York (state)
Boston University College of Arts and Sciences alumni
Cornell University alumni
American male film actors
American male television actors